Shenzhen Pengcheng Football Club is a defunct amateur Chinese football club that participated in the China League Two. The team is based in Shenzhen, Guangdong.

On February 5, 2020 Shenzhen Pengcheng officially announced their withdrawal from 2020 China League Two.

Managerial history
  Zhang Jian (2017)
  Chen Dazhi (2018–2020)

Results
All-time league rankings

As of the end of 2019 season.

 In group stage.

Key
 Pld = Played
 W = Games won
 D = Games drawn
 L = Games lost
 F = Goals for
 A = Goals against
 Pts = Points
 Pos = Final position

 DNQ = Did not qualify
 DNE = Did not enter
 NH = Not Held
 – = Does Not Exist
 R1 = Round 1
 R2 = Round 2
 R3 = Round 3
 R4 = Round 4

 F = Final
 SF = Semi-finals
 QF = Quarter-finals
 R16 = Round of 16
 Group = Group stage
 GS2 = Second Group stage
 QR1 = First Qualifying Round
 QR2 = Second Qualifying Round
 QR3 = Third Qualifying Round

References

Football clubs in China
Defunct football clubs in China
Sport in Shenzhen
Association football clubs established in 2016
2016 establishments in China
2020 disestablishments in China
Association football clubs disestablished in 2020